This article lists films set in ancient Egypt. This also includes mythological films and films only partially set in ancient Egypt.

1890s

1900s

1910s

1920s

1930s

1940s

1950s

1960s

1970s

1980s

1990s

2000s

2010s

External links
 Films set in ancient Egypt (IMDb)

See also

 Fiction set in ancient Rome
 Fiction set in ancient Greece
 Lists of historical films
 List of films set in ancient Rome
 List of films set in ancient Greece
 List of films based on classical mythology

 
Egypt, ancient
Films by period of setting